Actia nudibasis is a Palearctic species of flies in the family Tachinidae.

Distribution
Austria, Germany, United Kingdom, Hungary, Poland, Sweden, Russia, Japan.

Hosts
Retinia resinella & Rhyacionia buoliana.

References

nudibasis
Muscomorph flies of Europe
Diptera of Asia
Insects described in 1924